Saunier is a French surname. Notable people with the surname include:

Greg Saunier (born 1969), American drummer for the band Deerhoof
Matthieu Saunier (born 1990), French footballer
Pierre-Paul Saunier (1751–1818), French gardener and explorer

See also
Lons-le-Saunier, French commune

French-language surnames